Sakari Lindfors (born April 27, 1966) is a Finnish former professional ice hockey player who played in the SM-liiga. He played for HIFK and had time abroad in Italian, Swedish and Austrian leagues. He was inducted into the Finnish Hockey Hall of Fame in 2005.

External links
 Finnish Hockey Hall of Fame bio

1966 births
Finnish ice hockey goaltenders
HIFK (ice hockey) players
Graz 99ers players
Färjestad BK players
Quebec Nordiques draft picks
Olympic silver medalists for Finland
Olympic medalists in ice hockey
Medalists at the 1988 Winter Olympics
Olympic ice hockey players of Finland
Ice hockey players at the 1988 Winter Olympics
Ice hockey people from Helsinki
Living people